Awutu-Senya is one of the constituencies represented in the Parliament of Ghana. It elects one Member of Parliament (MP) by the first past the post system of election. Awutu-Senya is located in the Awutu/Effutu/Senya district of the Central Region of Ghana. Leading into the 2012 elections the constituency was divided into two Awutu-Senya East and Awutu-Senya West.

Boundaries
The seat is located entirely within the Awutu/Effutu/Senya district of the Central Region of Ghana.

Members of Parliament

Elections

See also
 List of Ghana Parliament constituencies
Awutu-Senya West Constituency 
Awutu-Senya East Constituency
 Awutu/Effutu/Senya District

References

Parliamentary constituencies in the Central Region (Ghana)